NARS Cosmetics is a French cosmetics and skin care company founded by make-up artist and photographer François Nars in 1994. The cosmetics line began with twelve lipsticks sold at Barneys New York. Since then, NARS has created various multi-use beauty products and is now a subsidiary of Shiseido. It mainly sells in department stores in about 30 countries including the Americas, Europe, Japan and Southeast Asia.

Founder
François Nars was born in Tarbes in the south of France, and grew up influenced by his mother Claudette and her collection of designer clothes. She also helped him acquire his first job as an assistant to some of Paris' top makeup artists. After graduating from Carita Makeup school in Paris, Nars moved to New York in 1984, and became known for his love of color and modern style. He also worked with photographer Steven Meisel and hairstylist Oribe Canales. In the eighties and nineties, they produced magazine editorials in American Vogue, Vogue Italia, and Elle.

In 1994, Nars launched NARS Cosmetics. Although the company was sold to Shiseido in 2000, Nars remains as artistic director, in-house photographer, and copywriter for his brand.

Products
NARS' minimalist matte black, rubber packaging was created by Fabien Baron, who Nars met on a shoot in 1989.

NARS has an "Orgasm Collection" which includes powder blush, liquid blush, loose powder, lip gloss,
lip stick, lip balm, multiple use cream sticks, illuminators, full vinyl lip lacquer, and nail polish.

Controversy

Animal testing
NARS is no longer a cruelty-free brand. In 2017, NARS announced that, despite being against animal testing, it was a requirement for selling products in the China market. In a public statement the company said: "We have decided to make NARS available in China because we feel it is important to bring our vision of beauty and artistry to fans in the region. NARS does not test on animals or ask others to do so on our behalf, except where required by law." The statement elicited a number of critical responses, some suggesting a boycott of its products.

References

External links

Official website

Cosmetics brands
Cosmetics companies of Japan
Cosmetics companies of the United States
2000 mergers and acquisitions